"Lettera" (English: "Letter") is a song by Italian singer Laura Pausini, released in 1994 as the third single from her second studio album, Laura. The song was also translated in Spanish for her album Laura Pausini, with the title "Carta".

Track listing
CD Single (CGD 4509 98252-2)
 "Lettera" – 3:42
 "La soledad" – 4:04
 "Perché non torna più" – 4:10

Charts

Weekly charts

"Lettera"

"Carta"

References

Laura Pausini songs
Pop ballads
1994 singles
Italian-language songs
Spanish-language songs
Songs written by Cheope
Songs written by Angelo Valsiglio
1994 songs
Compagnia Generale del Disco singles